Herbert Swire (born 1936), best known as Jim Swire, is an English doctor best known for his involvement in the aftermath of the 1988 bombing of Pan Am Flight 103, in which his daughter Flora was killed. Swire lobbied toward a solution for the difficulties in bringing suspects in the original bombing to trial, and later advocated the retrial and release of Abdelbaset al-Megrahi, the originally convicted suspect in the case. 

In 1990 Swire also carried a fake bomb onto an aircraft as a demonstration of lax security.

Lockerbie bombing

On 20 December 1988, Swire's 23-year-old daughter Flora, who wanted to fly to the United States to spend Christmas with her American boyfriend, had little difficulty in booking a seat on the next day's half-empty transatlantic Pan Am Flight 103. Flora died when it crashed at the town of Lockerbie, Scotland, killing 270 including 11 on the ground. Investigations were soon launched in the United States and the United Kingdom.

Eventually, two Libyans, Abdelbaset al-Megrahi and Lamin Khalifah Fhimah, were accused.

Swire became a spokesman for UK Families Flight 103, a group of family members of those who had died in the air crash.

Swire planted a memorial wood for his daughter, known as Flora's Wood.

Fake bomb

On 18 May 1990, Swire took a fake bomb on board a British Airways flight from London's Heathrow airport to New York's JFK and then on a flight from New York JFK to Boston to show that airline security had not improved; his fake bomb consisted of a radio cassette player and the confectionery marzipan, which was used as a substitute for Semtex. Some American family members asked Swire to keep the news of the stunt quiet; it became public six weeks later. Susan and Daniel Cohen, parents of Pan Am Flight 103 victim Theodora Cohen approved of the plan, while some other family members of American victims did not.

Trial of al-Megrahi and Fhimah

There was no extradition treaty between any of the countries involved: the United Kingdom, the U.S. and Libya, and Libyan law prevented the extradition of its citizens. Libya offered to detain the two accused and prosecute them, but that offer was turned down by the U.S. and Britain. In 1994, Professor Robert Black of Edinburgh University proposed that the two Libyans could be prosecuted under Scots law but in a neutral country. Nelson Mandela offered South Africa as the neutral venue; that proposal was rejected by Britain.

In 1997, Swire and Black decided to lobby for support of Black's proposal and visited Egypt and Libya. Swire went to America, the United Nations, Germany, back to Libya and then visited cities throughout the United Kingdom. Eventually Camp Zeist, Netherlands was chosen to become Scottish territory for the duration of criminal proceedings. The accused were handed over to Scottish police at Camp Zeist in May 1999, and the trial finally began on 5 May 2000. Swire was present, and when the verdicts were announced on 31 January 2001, acquitting Fhimah and convicting Megrahi, Swire fainted and had to be carried from the courtroom.

Appeal and release
Swire met Megrahi for the first time on Wednesday 16 November 2005 and spent an hour with him in the governor's office to ask Megrahi whether he would still press for the SCCRC to continue its review of his case if Megrahi were repatriated to Libya. Swire said Megrahi stated he would continue to pursue a review, and Swire added that UKF-103 would press for a review if Megrahi did not follow through.

On 28 June 2007 the SCCRC, after its four-year review, found that Megrahi's conviction could have been a miscarriage of justice and granted him leave for a second appeal to the Court of Criminal Appeal. Swire was interviewed on BBC Radio 4's Today Programme a few hours before the SCCRC announced its decision. Megrahi's second appeal was expected to be heard at the Court of Criminal Appeal in 2009.

In October 2007 Swire offered £500,000 to lawyers trying to prove the innocence of al-Megrahi.

In December 2008 Peter Fraser, Lord Fraser of Carmyllie, the former lord advocate, said that Swire's insistence that Al Megrahi was innocent was comparable to the "Stockholm syndrome", where captives grow to admire and defend their captors. Many American families of victims criticised Swire for his support of Libya. Swire said that he felt upset by Fraser's comments. Fraser defended his position, insisting on his choice of words.

In the same month, Swire founded the Justice for Megrahi Campaign which sought interim release from jail for Megrahi, who had been diagnosed with metastasized prostatic cancer and was terminally ill, so that he could return to his family in Libya pending his second appeal against conviction.

On 20 August 2009, owing to the cancer, Megrahi was released on compassionate grounds by the Scottish Justice Secretary, Kenny MacAskill. Application had also been made to transfer Megrahi to Libya through a prisoner transfer agreement between the UK government and Libya, though, to meet the criteria for this transfer, the conviction of a prisoner needed to be final and, ostensibly, to facilitate this, Megrahi abandoned his appeal. Swire expressed his approval of the release but disappointment that the appeal had been abandoned. In January 2012 Swire travelled to Tripoli to meet with Megrahi's before the latter died.

References

External links
Website of Dr Jim Swire and Peter Biddulph
Dr Jim Swire: My hopes
Aims & Objectives of Justice for Megrahi campaign
Taking a Stand. BBC Radio 4. Broadcast 2 February 2010.

1936 births
20th-century English medical doctors
Pan Am Flight 103
Living people
People educated at Eton College
People from Windsor, Berkshire
Alumni of the University of Birmingham
Royal Engineers officers
Alumni of the University of Cambridge